Kordlu may refer to:
 Kordlu, Ardabil
 Kordlu, Zanjan